WLCN may refer to:

 WLCN (FM), a radio station (96.3 FM) licensed to Atlanta, Illinois, United States
 WLCN-CD, a television station (channel 18) licensed to Charleston, South Carolina, United States